Karl-Robert Ameln (September 4, 1919 – April 1, 2016) was a Swedish sailor who competed in the 1948 Summer Olympics and in the 1952 Summer Olympics. He was born in Stockholm. In 1948 he won the bronze medal as a crew member of the Swedish boat Ali Baba II in the 6 metre class. Four years later he finished fourth as a crew member of the Swedish boat May Be II in the 6 metre class event.

References

External links
Karl-Robert Ameln's profile at databaseOlympics.com
Karl-Robert Ameln's profile at Sports Reference.com
Karl-Robert Ameln's profile at the Swedish Olympic Committee 

1919 births
2016 deaths
Sportspeople from Stockholm
Swedish male sailors (sport)
Olympic sailors of Sweden
Sailors at the 1948 Summer Olympics – 6 Metre
Sailors at the 1952 Summer Olympics – 6 Metre
Olympic bronze medalists for Sweden
Olympic medalists in sailing

Medalists at the 1948 Summer Olympics